Sir Wilfrid Lawson, 2nd Baronet may refer to:

 Sir Wilfrid Lawson, 2nd Baronet, of Isell (1664–1704), MP for Cockermouth 1690–1695
Sir Wilfrid Lawson, 2nd Baronet, of Brayton (1829–1906), British Liberal Party politician and temperance leader

See also 
Wilfrid Lawson (disambiguation)